Imleria is a genus of fungi in the family Boletaceae. It was erected in 2014 by Alfredo Vizzini as a new genus for what had previously been named Boletus badius or Xerocomus badius. It was placed in its own genus because of its distinct morphological features and because it had previously been found to belong in its own genus in a molecular phylogenetics study by Gelardi et al. (2013). Zhu et al. (2014) placed three more species in Imleria. Species of Imleria can be found in Europe, North America and Asia. The genus is named in honor of Belgian mycologist Louis Imler (1900–1993).

Species
 Imleria badia
 Imleria heteroderma
 Imleria obscurebrunnea
 Imleria parva
 Imleria subalpina

References

External links

Boletaceae
Boletales genera